Digitaria abyssinica, the East African couchgrass, is a species of flowering plant in the family Poaceae. It is native to SubSaharan Africa (except West Africa), Madagascar, many of the Indian Ocean islands, the Arabian Peninsula, Sri Lanka, Peninsular Malaysia, Vietnam, New Guinea, and Queensland in Australia, and it has been introduced to scattered locations in Central America and northern South America, and to Saint Helena. Although it is a livestock forage, albeit a lowquality one, it is generally considered a noxious weed.

References

abyssinica
Flora of Nigeria
Flora of West-Central Tropical Africa
Flora of Northeast Tropical Africa
Flora of East Tropical Africa
Flora of South Tropical Africa
Flora of Southern Africa
Flora of the Western Indian Ocean
Flora of Saudi Arabia
Flora of Yemen
Flora of Sri Lanka
Flora of Vietnam
Flora of New Guinea
Flora of Queensland
Plants described in 1907